Buffumville Lake is a ,  capacity United States Army Corps of Engineers flood control lake project located in Charlton, Massachusetts. The lake and surrounding grounds are open to the public for hiking, boating, fishing, and hunting. A 27-hole frisbee golf course is located next to the lake. Buffumville Lake is managed as a unit with the nearby Hodges Village Dam flood control project.

The  Midstate Trail is accessible from the north end of the lake.

References
"Buffumville Lake information, U.S. Army Corps of Engineers, New England District

Lakes of Worcester County, Massachusetts
Reservoirs in Massachusetts